Pious is a thriller novel by the American author Kenn Bivins, published in October 2010. The novel chronicles the reactions of Carpious Mightson and his neighbors when a registered sex offender, Ian Kaplan, moves into the family-friendly neighborhood, Mechi Lane.

Carpious is an esteemed, charismatic leader in his community, but it is slowly revealed that there is a duality about him. He has a personal connection to Ian that he would prefer stays hidden.

Bivins delves into societal perceptions of sex offenders versus violent offenders and how it seems commonplace and accepted that sex-offenders cannot be rehabilitated. The overarching theme of the novel is forgiveness.

Title
Pious is an ironic play on the virtue of piety which the main character, Carpious, seems to be in conflict of possessing. The character's name is combination of that virtue and the Christian symbol of the fish, carp.

External links 
Pious official website

2010 American novels
American thriller novels
American Christian novels
Novels by Kenn Bivins (author)
2010 debut novels